Ganjingzi District is one of the seven districts of Dalian, Liaoning province, People's Republic of China, forming part of the urban core.

Administrative divisions
There are 15 subdistricts in the district.

Subdistricts:

Education
The following secondary schools are within Ganjingzi District:
Dalian No. 11 High School
Dalian No. 20 High School
Dalian No. 23 High School
Dalian No. 76 Middle School
Dalian No. 80 Middle School
High School Attached to Dalian University of Technology
Dalian Hongqi Senior High School
Dalian Yuwen Middle School
The following universities are within Ganjingzi District:
Dalian University of Technology
Dalian Maritime University
Dalian Polytechnic University
Dalian Neusoft University of Information
Liaoning Police College

References

External links
 Official Website of the Ganjingzi District Government

Districts of Dalian